Yasin Karaca (born 16 December 1983) is a Turkish former footballer who played as a midfielder.

Career
Karaca was born in Paal, Belgium to ethnic Kurdish parents originally from Iğdır, Turkey.

He can play as an attacking midfielder or as a striker. Karaca spent the second half of the 2007–08 season on loan at Yeni Kırşehirspor in TFF Second League. He also spent a few weeks on trial with Galatasaray during the winter break of 2002–03 season.

Karaca is a product of the Anderlecht youth system. However, he could never make it to the big scene so far although he was capped several times for Turkish national football team at youth levels.

In early August 2011, Karaca has been on trial at newly promoted Serbian SuperLiga club FK Novi Pazar.

After a small period in Luxemburg First Division sides Dudelange and Wiltz he came back to Belgian 4th Division side R. Olympic Charleroi at mid-season 2012-2013.

References

1983 births
Living people
Belgian footballers
Belgian people of Turkish descent
Turkish footballers
Turkish people of Azerbaijani descent
Akçaabat Sebatspor footballers
Sivasspor footballers
De Graafschap players
R.S.C. Anderlecht players
K.V.C. Westerlo players
Ethnikos Asteras F.C. players
Turkey youth international footballers
Turkey under-21 international footballers
K. Beringen F.C. players
People from Beringen, Belgium
Association football forwards
Association football midfielders
Footballers from Limburg (Belgium)
Süper Lig players
TFF First League players